Hospital Universitario de Canarias or University Hospital of the Canary Islands it is a teaching hospital of general scope in Tenerife (Canary Islands, Spain). Located in the city of San Cristóbal de La Laguna. Affiliated with the education and research network of the Universidad de La Laguna it is under the directive of the Servicio Canario de Salud (Canary Health Service). The hospital has specialist facilities which not only serve Tenerife but the surrounding Canary Islands.

Founded in 1971 under the name of General and Clinical Hospital of Tenerife a floor area of  near the Autopista del Norte de Tenerife surface. With a total of 2,534 professionals is geared to health care in the north of Tenerife, and referral hospital for the island of La Palma.

It is near the Hospital Universitario Nuestra Señora de Candelaria, a referral hospital in some specialties in Spain. The Hospital Universitario de Canarias was also the first hospital in the Canary Islands hold the category of University Hospital, hence its name.

See also
 Hospital Universitario Nuestra Señora de Candelaria

References

External links
 Official site (in Spanish)

Hospital buildings completed in 1971
Teaching hospitals in Spain
Hospitals in Tenerife
Hospitals established in 1971
San Cristóbal de La Laguna
1971 establishments in Spain
Hospitals in the Canary Islands